Cecil Leonardo Leiva Reyes (Viña del Mar, November 30, 1979) also known as Leo Rey (derived from his second name and maternal surname), is a Chilean singer and former vocalist of the group La Noche.

References

External links

1979 births
People from Viña del Mar
21st-century Chilean male singers
Chilean singer-songwriters
Living people
Musicians from Viña del Mar